Hillion (Gallo: Hilion) is a commune in the Côtes-d'Armor department of Brittany in northwestern France.

Economy
Mussel farming is an important activity since 10% of French mussels, about 3 000 to 4 000 tons are produced in Hillion. The species are Mytilus galloprovincialis, adapted to the climate, and Mytilus edulis. Each year, the festival "La fete de la moule" (mussels festival) is held in August in the mussels farm.

Population

Inhabitants of Hillion are called hillionnais in French.

See also
Communes of the Côtes-d'Armor department

References

External links

Communes of Côtes-d'Armor